WEPX-TV (channel 38) is a television station licensed to Greenville, North Carolina, United States, broadcasting the Ion Television network to Eastern North Carolina. Owned and operated by the Ion Media subsidiary of the E. W. Scripps Company, the station maintains a transmitter northwest of New Bern, North Carolina.

WPXU-TV (channel 35) in Jacksonville, North Carolina, operates as a full-time satellite of WEPX-TV.

WEPX and WPXU were affiliates of MyNetworkTV from September 5, 2006 until September 27, 2009 when MyNetworkTV's affiliation switched over to WITN-TV, prior to this, the stations were solely affiliates of Ion (then known as i: Independent Television and originally known as Pax TV).

Technical information

Subchannels
The station's digital signal is multiplexed:

Analog-to-digital conversion
Because it was granted an original construction permit after the Federal Communications Commission (FCC) finalized the DTV allotment plan on April 21, 1997 , the station did not initially receive a companion channel for a digital television station. WEPX was later assigned channel 51, and the digital signal signed on February 5, 2008. WEPX has filed a letter with the FCC requesting to move from channel 51 to channel 26. This is part of a larger move for the FCC to get TV stations off channel 51 to prevent interference with cell phone devices.

References

External links 

Ion Television affiliates
Court TV affiliates
Grit (TV network) affiliates
Laff (TV network) affiliates
E. W. Scripps Company television stations
Defy TV affiliates
TrueReal affiliates
Scripps News affiliates
Television channels and stations established in 1998
1998 establishments in North Carolina
EPX-TV